Team Australia was an auto racing team competing in the V8 Supercars and Champ Car World Series. It was created in early 2005 when two Australian businessmen Craig Gore and John Fish bought into Derrick Walker's Walker Racing operation. After the 2007 the operation was scaled back to just Will Power who joined KV Racing, before ending entirely a year later.

Origins
After sponsoring young Australian driver Josh Hunt in the Toyota Atlantic Championship, Australian millionaire Craig Gore began to investigate fielding a Champ Car team. His empire already included a V8 Supercar team competing in Australia, and at the 2004 Surfers Paradise round of the CCWS, on the Gold Coast, Australia, Gore's V8 driver David Besnard made his debut with a WPS sponsored Walker Racing Champ Car. He finished a creditable 7th place, and the seeds were sewn for Gore's assault on the Champ Car series.

In late 2004 and early 2005 Gore, his associate John Fish and long time Champ Car World Series team owner Derrick Walker, created the Team Australia race program. Obsolete Reynard chassis were replaced with bespoke Lola units, and the team signed Canadian Champ Car veteran Alex Tagliani and Australian Formula 3 driver Marcus Marshall for the 2005 season.

A learning year
With a new chassis to learn, Team Australia was hardly going to upset the establishment in 2005. However, Tagliani's consistent, solid drives took the team to many top-ten finishes and several podiums through the year. Tagliani finished the season in seventh place, equaling his career best finish. Marshall, by contrast, was unspectacular, struggling to break the top ten. By Team Australia's homecoming at the 2005 Surfer's Paradise race, they had announced that a third car would be run for Australian international driver Will Power. Power outpaced both teammates before a collision with Tagliani took him out of the race.
Amongst some controversy it was announced that Marshall's contract had been cut, and he was to leave the team. His attempt to appeal this in court was unsuccessful, and he was dropped in favour of Power, who signed a three-year contract.
The team ran their third car again in the season finale at Mexico, where newly crowned Atlantics champion Dutchman Charles Zwolsman made his debut.

2006
Rumours that Ryan Briscoe would be taking the #15 car were crushed when Tagliani re-signed prior to Long Beach. In 2006, Team Australia's commitment extended not only to two Champ Cars, but a two-car Atlantic squad, all aimed at fostering young talent.
The team showed fantastic pace at the opening round at Long Beach, with Tagliani and Power running third and fourth respectively before a forced error dropped him down the order. He then suffered from brake problems but finished a competitive 9th, while Tagliani took a podium.

The team had consistent top-ten finishes, never really achieving more until Will Power took a pole position at his home race at Surfer's Paradise. He led the race comfortably until Sébastien Bourdais made a move on Power which damaged both cars. Power finished well down the order, but made up for it with a podium at the season finale in Mexico. He also won the Roshfrans Rookie of the Year title, as well as the Bridgestone Passion for Excellence award, the first driver other than Bourdais to win it.

NASCAR Craftsman Truck Series
Craig Gore expanded the Team Australia stable of global motorsport interests with a partnership with Wood Brothers/JTG Racing that included the naming-rights sponsorship of Marcos Ambrose's entry in the NASCAR Craftsman Truck Series in 2006.

The sponsorship was weaved into a nationwide marketing campaign designed to promote quality Australian and Australian-themed products and Australia as a tourism destination. The new green and gold Ford F-150 truck carried Team Australia, Aussie Vineyards and R. M. Williams signage.

Driving the #20 Aussie Vineyards Ford F-150, Ambrose had best finishes of 3rd in Kansas and Nashville and took the pole position in Kentucky.

Atlantic series
In their first year of Atlantic, the team won their first title, with young French driver Simon Pagenaud. He was partnered by James Davison initially, until the underperforming Australian was dropped in favour of countrymate Michael Patrizi.

Team details
The team gained most of its sponsorship from the businesses of Gore and Fish. Gore's financial company, Wright Patton Shakespeare, features on the sides and nosecone of the cars, Fish Liquor are sponsors and their wine business Aussie Vineyards was the title sponsor. The team was also sponsored by the Queensland State Government, Visa credit cards, R. M. Williams, and Qantas. The relationship ended in early 2008 and Gore, Fish and Walker are no longer directly involved, with Walker announcing that Walker Racing will not contest the unified 2008 IRL season. Gore has taken driver Will Power and the Team Australia name to KV Racing.

Drivers who have driven for Team Australia
IndyCar (2008) (KV Racing)
 Will Power (2008)

Champ Car (2005–2007) (Walker Racing)
 David Besnard (2004)
 Alex Tagliani (2005–2006)
 Marcus Marshall (2005)
 Will Power (2005–2007)
 Charles Zwolsman (2005)
 Simon Pagenaud (2007)

V8 Supercars (2004–2007) (WPS Racing)
 David Besnard (2004–2006)
 Mark Noske (2004)
 Owen Kelly (2004)
 Alex Yoong (2004)
 Charlie O'Brien (2004)
 Neil McFadyen (2004)
 John McIntyre (2004)
 Marcus Marshall (2005)
 Alex Tagliani (2005)
 Craig Baird (2005–2006)
 Max Wilson (2006–2007)
 Jason Bargwanna (2006–2007)
 Michael Caruso (2007)
 Grant Denyer (2007)

Champ Car Atlantics (2006–2007) (Walker Racing)
 Simon Pagenaud (2006)
 James Davison (2006)
 Michael Patrizi (2006)
 Ryan Lewis (2007)
 Simona de Silvestro (2007)

NASCAR Craftsman Truck Series (2006) (Wood Brothers/JTG Racing)
 Marcos Ambrose (2006)

NASCAR Busch Series (2007) (Wood Brothers/JTG Racing)
 Marcos Ambrose (2007)

Complete motorsport results

V8 Supercar
to be completed
(key)
 Bold indicates pole position.

Champ Car Atlantic Championship
(key) (results in bold indicate pole position) (results in italics indicate fastest lap)

Champ Car World Series
(key) (results in bold indicate pole position) (results in italics indicate fastest lap)

NASCAR
(key) (Bold – Pole position awarded by qualifying time. Italics – Pole position earned by points standings or practice time. * – Most laps led.)

Craftsman Truck Series

Busch Series

Overall stats

References

External links
Team Australia Motorsport
WPS Racing
Walker Racing

Australian auto racing teams
Champ Car teams
Atlantic Championship teams